Time of Your Life is an original novel written by Steve Lyons which is based on the long-running British science fiction television series Doctor Who. The novel features the Sixth Doctor and Grant Markham.

Plot
The Network broadcasts entertainment to the planets of the Meson system: Sixteen channels worth, and for the citizens of poverty-stricken Torrok, television offers the only escape from a horrible reality. Angela, from Torrok, leaps at the opportunity to travel to the Network, alongside a strange hermit called the Doctor. However, all is not well on the space station: A soap star has killed his wife's lover; the robotic cast of Timeriders are performing random abductions, and a deadly new game show is about to begin transmission.

References

External links 
 Time of Your Life at The Cloister Library

1995 British novels
1995 science fiction novels
Virgin Missing Adventures
Sixth Doctor novels
Novels by Steve Lyons
Novels set in the 22nd century